Live at the Royal Albert Hall is the debut live album by Scottish recording artist Emeli Sandé. The album was released on 18 February 2013. The set features the headline concert filmed at London's Royal Albert Hall on 11 November 2012. The set includes Sandé's hit singles, and songs from her number one selling debut album Our Version of Events. The set also includes a cover from one of Sandé's idols, Nina Simone, as well as two new songs, "Enough" and "Pluto". Professor Green made a brief appearance during "Read All About It, Pt. III" and Labrinth and Sandé performed "Beneath Your Beautiful" during the encore.

Track listing

Charts

Weekly charts

Year-end charts

Certifications

Release history

References 

2013 live albums
Emeli Sandé albums
Albums produced by Naughty Boy
Capitol Records live albums
Virgin Records live albums
EMI Records live albums
Capitol Records video albums
Virgin Records video albums
EMI Records video albums
Live albums recorded at the Royal Albert Hall